Gregory George Katsas (born August 6, 1964) is a United States circuit judge of the United States Court of Appeals for the District of Columbia Circuit.

Early life and education 
Katsas was born in 1964 in Boston, Massachusetts; his parents were Greek immigrants. Katsas graduated from Princeton University in 1986 with a Bachelor of Arts cum laude. He then attended Harvard Law School, where he was an executive editor of the Harvard Law Review and an editor of the Harvard Journal of Law and Public Policy. He graduated from Harvard in 1989 with a Juris Doctor cum laude.

Legal career
After law school, Katsas served as a law clerk to Judge Edward R. Becker of the U.S. Court of Appeals for the Third Circuit from 1989 to 1990. From 1990 to 1991, Katsas clerked for Clarence Thomas, who was then a judge of the District of Columbia Circuit. Thomas was appointed to the U.S. Supreme Court in 1991, where Katsas clerked for him again from 1991 to 1992.

Katsas then entered private practice at the Washington, D.C. office of the law firm Jones Day, where he specialized in civil and appellate litigation. He argued more than 75 appeals, including three cases in the U.S. Supreme Court. He was at Jones Day from 1992 to 2001, becoming a partner in 1999.

From 2001 to 2009, Katsas served in various positions within the United States Department of Justice, including Assistant Attorney General for the Civil Division and Acting Associate Attorney General. Katsas returned to Jones Day from 2009 to 2017. From January to December 2017, Katsas served as Deputy White House Counsel.

Federal judicial service 
On September 7, 2017, President Donald Trump nominated Katsas to serve as a United States Circuit Judge of the United States Court of Appeals for the District of Columbia Circuit, to the seat vacated by Judge Janice Rogers Brown, who retired on August 31, 2017.

On October 17, 2017, a hearing on his nomination was held before the Senate Judiciary Committee. On November 9, 2017, his nomination was reported out of committee by an 11–9 vote.

On November 27, 2017, the United States Senate invoked cloture by a 52–48 vote. On November 28, 2017, by a party line vote except for John Neely Kennedy R-LA and Joe Manchin D-WV, with Bob Corker and John McCain absent, the Senate voted to confirm Katsas by a 50–48 vote. He received his judicial commission on December 8, 2017.

In 2017, Katsas recused himself from matters regarding the Mueller's probe on which he personally worked, but said he would consider the facts of a case before making a decision.

On September 9, 2020, President Trump included him on a list of his potential nominees to the Supreme Court.

On July 6, 2021, Judge Katsas gave the tie-breaking 2-1 vote that overturned the FDA's ban on GEDs used predominantly by the Judge Rotenberg Center on disabled patients in Canton, MA.

Memberships 
He is a member of the Federalist Society, and also a member of the American Academy of Appellate Lawyers.

Awards 
In 2009, he was awarded the Edmund Randolph award for outstanding service, the highest award bestowed by the U.S. Department of Justice.

See also 

 List of law clerks of the Supreme Court of the United States (Seat 10)
 Donald Trump Supreme Court candidates

References

External links 
 
 Biography at U.S. Court of Appeals for the District of Columbia Circuit
 
 Appearances at the U.S. Supreme Court from the Oyez Project
 
 Articles about Greg Katsas. AbovetheLaw.com.

|-

|-

1964 births
Living people
20th-century American lawyers
21st-century American lawyers
21st-century American judges
American people of Greek descent
Federalist Society members
George W. Bush administration personnel
Harvard Law School alumni
Jones Day people
Judges of the United States Court of Appeals for the D.C. Circuit
Law clerks of the Supreme Court of the United States
Lawyers from Washington, D.C.
People from Boston
Princeton University alumni
Trump administration personnel
United States Assistant Attorneys General for the Civil Division
United States Associate Attorneys General
United States court of appeals judges appointed by Donald Trump
Washington, D.C., Republicans